Raja Lakhamagouda dam, also known as Hidkal dam, is a dam constructed across the Ghataprabha River in the Krishna River basin. It is situated at Hidkal village in Hukkeri Taluk of Belagavi district in North Karnataka, India. The dam with the height of 62.48 metres and 10 Vertical Crest Gates, impounds a large reservoir with a gross surface area of 63.38 Square kilometres, and storage capacity of 51.16 Tmcft. It is an earthen and masonry dam which caters to the Irrigation needs for over 8,20,000 acres, and Hydel power generation. It is constructed as a part of the Ghataprabha Irrigation project which was completed in three phases and finished in 2009. The dam is named after Raja Lakhamagouda Sardesai, philanthropist and Zamindar of Vantamuri.

See also

List of dams and reservoirs in Karnataka

References

Dams in Karnataka
Hydroelectric power stations in Karnataka
Reservoirs in Karnataka
Buildings and structures in Belagavi district
Tourist attractions in Belagavi district
Dams completed in 1977
1977 establishments in Karnataka
20th-century architecture in India